Carson Van Osten (September 24, 1945 – December 22, 2015) was an American comics creator and musician.

Early life
Van Osten studied at the Philadelphia College of Art.

Career

Music
In 1966, he played in the band Woody's Truck Stop, before forming the rock group Nazz with Todd Rundgren and Thom Mooney in 1967. Van Osten was the band's bass guitarist. He quit Nazz in 1969.

Comics
Later, Van Osten became a writer and artist of Disney comics. From 1969 to 1976, he created Mickey Mouse and Goofy comics for the publisher Disney Studio, which produced comics for the European market. Starting in 1976, he was art director for Disney's comic strips department in the 1980s. After that, he sporadically worked on new Disney comics, including some covers and the adaptation of the Atlantis: The Lost Empire film. He also created The Wuzzles for Disney Television Animation which was based on an idea pitched by then Disney CEO Michael Eisner.

On August 7, 2015, Van Osten was one of 10 individuals who were honored with a Disney Legends award.

Model railroading
Van Osten created an N scale model railroad, the Rio Poco, that was featured in the June 1991 issue of Model Railroader magazine. The layout was influenced by fellow Disney employee John Olson.

Death
He died on December 22, 2015.

References

External links

 Carson Van Osten in Lambiek's Comiclopedia
 Carson Van Osten's "Comic Strip Artist's Kit"

1945 births
2015 deaths
American comics artists
American comics writers
American rock bass guitarists
American male bass guitarists
American comic strip cartoonists
University of the Arts (Philadelphia) alumni
American male guitarists
20th-century American guitarists
Disney comics writers
Disney comics artists